Abu Dhabi Islamic Bank PJSC is an Islamic bank based in Abu Dhabi city, in the United Arab Emirates.

Establishment
Abu Dhabi Islamic Bank was established on 20 May 1997 as a Public Joint Stock Company through the Amiri Decree No. 9 of 1997. The Bank commenced commercial operations on 11 November 1998, and was formally inaugurated by Abdullah Bin Zayed Al Nahyan, UAE Minister of Information and Culture on 18 April 1999.
All contracts, operations and transactions are carried out in accordance with Islamic Shari'a principles.

Capital information
ADIB commenced its operations with a paid-up capital of one billion dirhams divided into one hundred million shares, the value of each share being ten dirhams. The shares are quoted on the Abu Dhabi Securities Market.

Founders
The founders of Abu Dhabi Islamic Bank hold 29% of its equity while the remaining 71% is held by approximately 100,000 shareholders. The founding shareholders of ADIB are:

The Abu Dhabi Investment Authority ADIA
Prominent UAE Nationals

Board of directors
Chairman - H.E. Jawaan Awaidha Suhail Awaidha Al Khaili
Group CEO - Mr. Nasser Al Awadhi
Vice Chairman & Board Member - Mr. Faisal Sultan Naser Salem Al Shuaibi
Board Member - Abdulla Ali Musleh Jumhour Al Ahbabi
Board Member - Mr. Abdul Wahab Al-Halabi
Board Member - Mr. Khalifa Matar Khalifa Qaroona Almheiri
Board Member - Mrs.​ Maha Al Qattan 
Board Member - Mr. Najib Youssef Fayyad

Official website
 ADIB Official Website
 ADIB Egypt Website
 ADIB UAE Website

See also

List of banks
List of banks in United Arab Emirates

References

 Information about the performance of ADIB shares on Bloomberg.com 
 News related to ADIB and related UAE Stock market 
 News from Euromoney.com 
 ADX quote 
 SCA quote 

Banks established in 1997
Companies based in Abu Dhabi
Companies listed on the Abu Dhabi Securities Exchange
Islamic banks of the United Arab Emirates
Emirati companies established in 1997